Pavona gigantea is a species from the genus Pavona. The species was originally described by Addison Emery Verrill in 1869.

References

Taxa named by Addison Emery Verrill
Animals described in 1869
Cnidarians of the Pacific Ocean